Peter K. Schott is an American economist, currently the Juan Trippe Professor at Yale School of Management.

References

External links

Year of birth missing (living people)
Living people
Yale School of Management faculty
American economists